Geoff Milliken (born 6 May 1964) is an Australian former cricketer. He played fifteen first-class and two List A matches for New South Wales between 1989/90 and 1991/92.

See also
 List of New South Wales representative cricketers

References

External links
 

1964 births
Living people
Australian cricketers
New South Wales cricketers
People from the Riverina
Cricketers from New South Wales